Greg Dalby (born November 3, 1985, in Newport Beach, California) is a former American soccer player who is now the head coach at Oregon State.

Career

Youth and College
For eight seasons through his teen years, he played on several San Diego clubs, including San Diego Soccer Club (1996–98), Rancho Bernardo Select (1996–98), La Jolla Nomads (1999-00), San Diego Surf (1998–99, 2000–03). He was named the 2003 MVP of the San Diego Surf.

He attended Poway High School, near San Diego, where his skills were recognized at a national level. In his senior year, he was given the highest U.S. award for any high school player, the Gatorade National High School Player of the Year. He was chosen from hundreds of thousands of males for that award, and given a spot on the under-18 U.S. National Team.  From there he was recruited by the University of Notre Dame, where he was team captain in the last two seasons. He was named first team All-American in 2005 and 2006.

Professional
On January 12, 2007, Dalby was chosen by Colorado Rapids of Major League Soccer as the number 17 overall pick in the 2007 MLS SuperDraft.  Instead of signing with the Rapids he chose to go to Europe to play.

Dalby had interest from Siena, Celtic and Preston North End but work permit issues  led him to sign with Charleroi of the Belgian Jupiler League on August 5, 2007. He made no appearances for Charleroi and at end of the season was let go by the club.  At that time he returned to the States and signed with Colorado. Dalby was waived by Colorado on March 19, 2010, and subsequently signed for Charlotte Eagles in the USL Second Division.

International
In 2005, he was also named captain of the U.S. Men's under-20 National Team, who played that year in the FIFA World Youth Championship.

References

External links
MLSNet.com full coverage 2007 SuperDraft
San Diego Union-Tribune Article on MLS SuperDraft
University of Notre Dame biography

 Greg Dalby current news, pics and bio at San Diego MLS Project
US Soccer national teams website
Davidson College biography

1985 births
Living people
Sportspeople from Newport Beach, California
Association football defenders
Association football midfielders
American soccer players
Major League Soccer players
USL First Division players
USL Second Division players
USL Championship players
Notre Dame Fighting Irish men's soccer players
Parade High School All-Americans (boys' soccer)
R. Charleroi S.C. players
Colorado Rapids players
North Carolina FC players
Charlotte Eagles players
United States men's under-20 international soccer players
United States men's under-23 international soccer players
Colorado Rapids draft picks
Soccer players from California
All-American men's college soccer players